Regular script (Hepburn: kaisho), also called ,  (zhēnshū),  (kǎitǐ) and  (zhèngshū), is the newest of the Chinese script styles (popularized from the Cao Wei dynasty c. 200 AD and maturing stylistically around the 7th century). It is the most common style in modern writings and third most common in publications (after the Ming and gothic styles, which are used exclusively in print).

History 

The Calligraphy Manual of Xuanhe Era (Xuānhé Shūpǔ) credit Wáng Cìzhòng with creating Regular script based on Clerical script in the early Western Hàn. This script came into popular usage between the Eastern Hàn and Cáo Wèi dynasties, and its first known master was Zhōng Yáo (sometimes also read Zhōng Yóu), who lived in the Eastern Hàn to Cáo Wèi period, c. 151–230 CE. He is also known as the "father of regular script", and his famous works include the Xuānshì Biǎo, Jiànjìzhí Biǎo, and Lìmìng Biǎo.  Qiu Xigui describes the script in Zhong's Xuānshì Biǎo as:

However, other than a few literati, very few wrote in this script at the time; most continued writing in neo-clerical script, or a hybrid form of semi-cursive and neo-clerical.  Regular script did not become dominant until the early Southern and Northern Dynasties, in the 5th century; there was a variety of regular script which emerged from neo-clerical as well as from Zhong Yao's regular script, known as "Wei regular" (Wèikǎi) or "Wei stele" (Wèibēi). Thus, regular script has parentage in early semi-cursive as well as neo-clerical scripts.

The script is considered to have matured stylistically during the Tang dynasty, with the most famous and oft-imitated regular script calligraphers of that period being:
 Four great calligraphers of the early Tang:
 Ouyang Xun
 Yu Shinan
 Chu Suiliang
 Xue Ji
 "Yan–Liu" ("")
 Yan Zhenqing
 Liu Gongquan

In the Northern Song dynasty, Emperor Huizong created an iconic style known as "Slender Gold".

In the Yuan dynasty, Zhao Mengfu is also known for his own calligraphic style for regular script, "Zhaoti".

In the Qing dynasty, the ninety-two rules for the fundamental structure of regular script are established, calligrapher  wrote a guidebook to illustrate these rules, each rule has four characters for sample.

Name
In addition to its many names in Chinese, regular script is also sometimes called "block script", "standard script" (alternate translation of ) or even "square style" in English.

Characteristics
Regular script characters with width (or length) larger than 5 cm (2 in) is usually considered larger regular script, or dakai, and those smaller than 2 cm (0.8 in) usually small regular script, or xiaokai. Those in between are usually called medium regular script, or zhongkai. What these are relative to other characters. The Eight Principles of Yong are said to contain a variety of most of the strokes found in regular script.

Notable writings in regular script include:
 The Records of Yao Boduo Sculpturing during the Southern and Northern dynasties
 The Tablet of Guangwu General during the Southern and Northern dynasties
 The Tablet of Longzang Temple of the Sui dynasty
 Tombstone-Record of Sui Xiaoci of the Sui dynasty
 Tombstone-Record of Beauty Tong of the Sui dynasty
 Sweet Spring at Jiucheng Palace of the Tang dynasty

Derivatives
 Imitation Song typefaces are typefaces based on a printed style which developed in the Song dynasty, from which Ming typefaces developed.
 The most common printed typeface styles Ming and sans-serif are based on the structure of regular script.
 The Japanese textbook typefaces (Hepburn: kyōkashotai) are based on regular script, but modified so that they appear to be written with a pencil or pen. They also follow the standardized character forms prescribed in the Jōyō kanji.
 Zhuyin Fuhao characters, although not true Chinese characters, are virtually always written with regular script strokes.

In computing

References

Citations

Sources 

 Qiu Xigui (2000). Chinese Writing. Early China Special Monograph Series No. 4. Berkeley: The Society for the Study of Early China and the Institute of East Asian Studies, University of California, Berkeley. .

External links 

 Regular Script "tao te king" CHAPTER LVII
 More on Standard Script In English, at BeyondCalligraphy.com

Writing systems
Chinese script style
Logographic writing systems
Chinese characters